Carl Berners plass is a square in Oslo, Norway. It is located in the borough Helsfyr, south of Sinsen. The Sinsen Line of the Oslo Tramway runs over the square. The colloquial expression for the square is just "Carl Berner". Around the square is a large number of shops as well as inexpensive restaurants. At the southern end of the area is the large Tøyen Park.

The name
The square is colloquially known simply as 'Carl Berner'. It is named after Carl Christian Berner (1841–1918), a Norwegian politician for the Liberal Party. He was member of the Council of State Division in Stockholm 1891–92, and Norwegian Minister of Education and Church Affairs 1891–93.

Transportation
Carl Berners plass is an underground rapid transit station located on the Grorud Line of the Oslo Metro, and a tram stop on the Sinsen Line of the Oslo Tramway. The square also has a bus stop for lines 20, 21, 31, 33 and 57.

Infrastructure improvements
In September 2007, a project for improving the square's visual and traffical capabilities was passed. The project started April 2008, and finished by autumn 2010. The square is served by the station with the same name. The square used to be controlled by traffic lights but is now rebuilt in to a roundabout, a circle that encircles a central square island.

In the literature
Both the square and the subway station figure prominently and significantly in Per Petterson's novel I curse the River of Time (2010).

References

Squares in Oslo